Mata Hari is a pinball machine created by Bally Manufacturing in 1977 and released in 1978. The theme of the game is based on Dutch exotic dancer, Mata Hari. It was mainly produced using solid-state electronics but also 170 electro-mechanical versions were released. It was the last model manufactured by Bally in two such versions.  Approximately 20 sample games were produced with a plastic playfield, instead of the traditional wooden playfield.

Description
The design noticeably consists of mainly dark, red and gold color artwork and a prominent image of a dagger running up the middle. A dagger is also depicted on the backglass in the hand of Mata Hari. One version is blank and one shows an inscription with the motto of the Nazi German SS "Meine Ehre heißt Treue" (German, "My honor is loyalty"). Mata Hari died during World War I therefore the inscription is an anachronism. Contrary to a popular belief, the version with inscription is not more rare than the one without. There were about equal numbers of both versions of backglasses made.

The game has chimes as it was designed before electronic sounds were used.  The table features two flippers, four pop bumpers, two slingshots, two four-bank drop targets and one kick-out hole. The machines makes use of a MPU 2518-17 circuit and an AS2518-18 power supply.

Gameplay
The game allows up to four players. The table has a completely symmetric playfield layout. The machine has a simple straight-forward rule set that offers a challenge to beginners and advanced players. Basically, there are three goals to accomplish: knock down the drop targets, complete the A-B combination a certain number of times and land in the kickout hole multiple times. The rules in detail are the following: Making ‘A’ and ‘B’ top rollover lanes or left and right ‘A’ and ‘B’ orbits scores and advances ‘A-B’ lit value which is displayed in the centre of the playfield. Landing the ball in the top kickout hole first time scores 3000 points, advances bonus value 3 places, lights 2x bonus multiplier and lights left outlane for 50,000 points. Second time lights right outlane for 50.000 points and 3x bonus multiplier. Third time lights 5x bonus multiplier. Knocking down all drop targets scores 50.000 points and lights target special light. A replay is available for making ‘A’ and ‘B’ when lit for special and another +50K for all target down when lit for special. The maximum is one extra ball per ball in play.

References

External links 
 
Instruction cards for Mata Hari

1977 pinball machines
Bally pinball machines
Cultural depictions of Mata Hari